In Greek mythology, Itys is a minor mythological character, the son of Tereus, a king of Thrace, by his Athenian wife Procne. Itys was murdered by his own mother and served to be consumed during dinner by his father, as part of a revenge plan against Tereus over him assaulting and raping Philomela, Procne's sister. His immediate family were all transformed into birds afterwards, and in some versions Itys too joins them in the avian kingdom. Itys' story survives in several accounts, the most extensive and famous among them being Ovid's Metamorphoses. His myth had been known since at least the sixth century BC.

Family 
Itys was the son of Procne, a princess of Athens, and Tereus, a Thracian king, thus nephew to Philomela. Through his father he was a grandson of the god of war Ares.

Mythology 
Itys was born and raised in Thrace. At some point his father Tereus raped Itys' maternal aunt Philomela while escorting her to Thrace on her visit to her sister Procne. Tereus cut Philomela's tongue so she could never be able to tell anyone her story, and abandoned her. Philomela however managed to weave a tapestry or robe with her story and sent it to her sister. In rage, Procne slew Itys, seeing him as but an image of his father, boiled him and served him as a meal to Tereus. After he finished his meal, the two sisters presented him with the disembodied head of Itys. Once he realised what had happened, Tereus hunted down the two sisters, who prayed to the gods. All three were transformed into birds. Procne became either the silent swallow or the singing nightingale which continued to mourn her slain son in her new life. "Itys" was also the name for the plaintive cry of the nightingale.

Pausanias on the other hand writes that Tereus was so remorseful for his actions against Philomela and Itys's fate at the hands of the women (the nature of which is not described in clear detail) that he killed himself. Eustathius's version of the story has the sisters reversed, so that Philomela married Tereus and became the mother of Itys.

In some texts, Itys is called Itylus instead, another mythological bird who was killed by his mother Aëdon, who then transformed into a nightingale. In one variation of the myth, Procne is called Aëdon and his father Polytechnus.

The fullest surviving account of Itys' tale comes to us via the Roman poet Ovid and his narrative poem the Metamorphoses, however the myth itself is much older, and Ovid's telling was largely influenced by Sophocles's now lost tragedy Tereus. Scholar Jenny Marsh theorized that Sophocles must had borrowed certain elements of the plot from Euripides's drama Medea.

She argues that the element of the enraged wife killing her child in an act of revenge against her husband's actions was directly borrowed from Euripides and incorporated in his tragedy. If accurate, that would mean that the infanticide of Itys did not appear in the myth of Procne and Philomela until Sophocles. Tellingly, the chorus in Medea state that they know only of one woman sans Medea herself that killed her children (Ino) without taking Procne into account.

In some versions, Itys himself was transformed into a bird like the rest of his family, specifically a pheasant, to be admired for its fine plumage. This element is not present in Ovid and most authors, who instead have Itys unceremoniously killed and eaten.

See also 

 Iphigenia
 Harpalyce
 Lycaon

Notes

References

Bibliography 
 Antoninus Liberalis, The Metamorphoses of Antoninus Liberalis translated by Francis Celoria (Routledge 1992). Online version at the Topos Text Project.
 
 
 Maurus Servius Honoratus, In Vergilii carmina comentarii. Servii Grammatici qui feruntur in Vergilii carmina commentarii; recensuerunt Georgius Thilo et Hermannus Hagen. Georgius Thilo. Leipzig. B. G. Teubner. 1881. Online version at the Perseus Digital Library.

External links 
 

Cannibalism
Filicides
Metamorphoses characters
Metamorphoses into birds in Greek mythology
Princes in Greek mythology
Thracian characters in Greek mythology